Ruslan Seilkhanov (born 30 October 1972) is a Kazakhstani judoka. He competed at the 1996 Summer Olympics and the 2000 Summer Olympics.

References

External links
 

1972 births
Living people
People from East Kazakhstan Region
Kazakhstani male judoka
Olympic judoka of Kazakhstan
Judoka at the 1996 Summer Olympics
Judoka at the 2000 Summer Olympics
Place of birth missing (living people)
Asian Games medalists in judo
Judoka at the 1998 Asian Games
Judoka at the 2002 Asian Games
Asian Games bronze medalists for Kazakhstan
Medalists at the 1998 Asian Games
20th-century Kazakhstani people
21st-century Kazakhstani people